Rudolf August Oetker (20 September 1916 – 16 January 2007) was a German entrepreneur and former member of the Nazi Party, who became a billionaire running his private food company Oetker-Gruppe, founded by his grandfather August Oetker.

Biography

Early life 
Oetker served and volunteered in the Waffen-SS from 1941 to 1944. Rudolf Oetker became the president of his family-run business in 1944. The business was inherited from his grandfather, August Oetker, who invented a popular mixture of baking powder.

Career 
Rudolf August Oetker elevated the company to a household name in Germany today. The Oetker-Gruppe was one of the symbols of the post-World War II recovery effort in the country.

Oetker retired as executive director in 1981, turning the position over to his son August Oetker (jr.).

In 2006, his net worth was estimated by Forbes at US$8.0 billion.

Personal life 
Oetker married three times and had eight children. His son Richard became CEO in 2010.

In 2014, the Oetker business empire was valued at $12 billion, and each of his eight children inherited an equal share of 12.5%, or about $1.5 billion:
Rosely Schweizer
August Oetker
Bergit Douglas
Christian Oetker
Richard Oetker
Alfred Oetker
Carl Ferdinand Oetker
Julia Oetker

After discovering Oetker's Nazi past, his children hired a provenance researcher to investigate the origins of his art collection. They have begun returning artworks found to be stolen or looted to the heirs of their Jewish owners. In 2019 a painting by Carl Spitzweg was restituted to the heirs of Leo Bendel who had been looted and murdered by Nazis. The painting had been acquired through the Galerie Heinemann in Munich.

See also 
 Dr. Oetker
 Oetker Collection
 List of billionaires
 Colnaghi
 Richard Kaselowsky

References

External links 
 
 
 

1916 births
2007 deaths
German billionaires
Businesspeople from Bielefeld
P. & D. Colnaghi & Co. people
People from the Province of Westphalia
Place of death missing
Dr. Oetker people
Waffen-SS personnel
20th-century German businesspeople
21st-century German businesspeople
20th-century art collectors
21st-century art collectors
German art collectors
20th-century English businesspeople